Studio One Forever is an upcoming documentary film by Marc Saltarelli about Studio One, an LGBT nightclub in West Hollywood, California. The film was initially scheduled to release in the United States in 2020, but it faced production delays and funding shortages due to the COVID-19 pandemic.

References

Documentary films about LGBT topics
LGBT in California
Upcoming films